Westleigh Farms is a historic home and farm located in Butler Township, Miami County, Indiana.  The farmhouse, known as the Porter-Cole House, was built about 1913, It is an asymmetrical two-story, brick dwelling in the Classical Revival style. The other main building is an imposing gambrel roof traverse frame barn over a basement (c. 1913).  Also on the property are the contributing power house / garage, calving barn / shop, brick tenant's house, and summer kitchen.

Westleigh Farms was the childhood home of composer and songwriter Cole Porter.

It was listed on the National Register of Historic Places in 2003.

References

Farms on the National Register of Historic Places in Indiana
Gothic Revival architecture in Indiana
Neoclassical architecture in Indiana
Houses completed in 1913
Buildings and structures in Miami County, Indiana
National Register of Historic Places in Miami County, Indiana